Joseph W. Hasel (October 28, 1906 – July 16, 1996) was a broadcaster who, among many other activities, interviewed Babe Ruth for Armed Forces Radio Service during World War II. Hasel attended Cheshire Academy, and donated his archives to the school. The materials include an interview with Babe Ruth.

Hasel also attended Columbia University for two years, and at one point, broadcast their football games. He also broadcast New York Giant games for radio station WNEW.

References

1906 births
1996 deaths
American sports radio personalities
Cheshire Academy alumni
Columbia University alumni